A heated roll laminator uses heated rollers to melt glue extruded onto lamination film. This film is in turn applied to a substrate such as paper or card using pressure rollers. The primary purpose of laminating with such a machine is to embellish or protect printed documents or images. Heated roll laminators can vary in size from office based pouch laminators to industrial sized machines. Such industrial machines are primarily used for high quantity/quality output by printers or print finishers.

Whether small office or industrial machines their primary function is to embellish or protect printed works. Such laminators are used to apply varying thicknesses of lamination film onto substrates such as paper or fabrics. The main advantage to the use of heated roll laminators is that of speed. Heated laminators use heated rollers or heated shoes to melt the glue which is applied to lamination film. The process of heating the glue prior to applying the film to a substrate allows for a faster application of the film. The laminates and adhesives used are generally cheaper to manufacture than cold roll laminates, often as much as half the cost depending on the comparison made. As the materials are non-adhesive until exposed to heat, they are much easier to handle. The glue is solid at room temperature, so lamination of this type is less likely to shift or warp after its application than pressure activated laminates, which rely on a highly viscous, adhesive fluid.

Film

Roll laminators typically use two rolls to complete the lamination process, with one roll being on top and the other roll on the bottom. These rolls slide onto metal bars, known as mandrels, which are then placed in the machine and feed through it. In the United States, the most common core size found on lamination film is one inch (25- to 27-inch-wide film). Larger format laminators use a larger core, often 2 to 3 inches in diameter. Film is usually available in 1.5, 3, 5, 7, and 10 mil thicknesses. The higher the number, the thicker the film. A mil is one thousandth of an inch (.001").

Printers or print finishers often use industrial heated roll laminators to laminate such things as paperback book covers, magazine covers, posters, cards and postcards, in-shop displays as well as other applications.

See also 
 Lamination
 Pouch laminator
 Cold roll laminator
Calender

References

Office equipment
Paper products
Articles containing video clips

de:Lamination
nl:Lamineerapparaat